Rati Ram (born September 10, 1934, in India) is a distinguished professor of economics at Illinois State University, Normal, Illinois, specializing in the economics of education.

Ram got his M.A. in philosophy and economics at Delhi University, and his M.A. and Ph.D. in economics at University of Chicago in 1977. Since 1986 he is Distinguished Professor at Illinois State University.

Selected publications 
 Tropics and Economic Development: An Empirical Investigation. Economics Department, Illinois State University, 1996.
 Tropics and economic development: An empirical investigation. In: World Development, vol. 25, issue 9, 1997, p. 1443–452 
 Tropics, income, and school life expectancy: an intercountry study. In: Economics of Education Review, 18, 1999, p. 253–258.

References

External links 
 Rati Ram at the Department of Economics, Illinois State University
 Rati Ram on Econ Journal Watch

American economists
Delhi University alumni
University of Chicago alumni
Illinois State University faculty
Washington State University faculty
Indian emigrants to the United States
Place of birth missing (living people)
Living people
1934 births